Marcus Tilley House, also known as the Roscoe Tilley House, is a historic home located at Bahama, Durham County, North Carolina.  It was built about 1880, and is a two-story, frame I-house built over an original -story log dwelling.  Also on the property is a contributing log smokehouse.

It was listed on the National Register of Historic Places in 2000.

References

Houses on the National Register of Historic Places in North Carolina
Houses completed in 1880
Houses in Durham County, North Carolina
National Register of Historic Places in Durham County, North Carolina